Beghe (or Beghè) is a surname. Notable people with this surname include:

 Bruno Beghé, American artist, author of the Joseph Ward marble sculpture
 Davide Beghè (1854–1933), Italian painter, mainly depicting sacred subjects and portraits
 Jason Beghe (born 1960), American film and television actor
 Renato Beghe (1933–2012), American Judge of the United States Tax Court
 Stéphanie Mugneret-Béghé (born 1974), French former football midfielder